The 1965 Polish Speedway season was the 1965 season of motorcycle speedway in Poland.

Individual

Polish Individual Speedway Championship
The 1965 Individual Speedway Polish Championship was held on 12 September at Rybnik.

Golden Helmet
The 1965 Golden Golden Helmet organised by the Polish Motor Union (PZM) was the 1965 event for league's leading riders.

Calendar

Final classification
Note: Result from final score was subtracted with two the weakest events.

Team

Team Speedway Polish Championship
The 1965 Team Speedway Polish Championship was the 18th edition of the Team Polish Championship. 

KS ROW Rybnik won the gold medal for the fourth consecutive season. The team included Joachim Maj, Antoni Woryna, Andrzej Wyglenda and Stanisław Tkocz.

First League

Second League

References

Poland Individual
Poland Team
Speedway
1965 in Polish speedway